The NWA Shockwave Women's Championship was a women's professional wrestling championship in NWA Shockwave (NWA-SW) and the National Wrestling Alliance (NWA). It was the original title of the CyberSpace Wrestling Federation promotion and was later recognized by the NWA as a regional title. It was introduced as the CSWF Women's Championship on January 25, 2003. It was established as an NWA women's championship in 2005 following the promotion's admission into the NWA. The promotion became NWA: Cyberspace, and later NWA Shockwave, with the title remaining active until its retirement in 2006.

The inaugural champion was Alexis Laree, who defeated Serena and April Hunter in a three way match on January 25, 2003 to become the first CSWF Women's Champion. There were four officially recognized champions, though none held the belt more than once. At 494 days, Jazz was the longest reigning champion in the title's history. This record is the highest of any other title in the promotion.

Title history

Names

Reigns

See also
List of National Wrestling Alliance championships

References

External links
NWA Shockwave on Myspace
NWA Cyberspace on Myspace
CSWF.com
CSWOL.com

NWA Shockwave championships
Women's professional wrestling championships
National Wrestling Alliance championships